The Peithologian Society was an undergraduate debate society at Columbia University. It was founded in 1806, four years after Columbia's first literary society, the Philolexian Society, by freshmen who were disenfranchised by Philolexian's requirement that its members be upperclassmen. Its emphasis on debate, composition, and rhetoric was similar to Philo's literary aims, and the two societies shared other superficial characteristics as well. Philo adopted light blue as its official color, while Peithologian adopted white (Columbia later appropriated the two hues as its own official school colors). Whereas Philolexian's symbol was a rising sun, Peithologian's was a star. Its Latin motto was "Vitam Impendere Vero" meaning, roughly, "To devote one's life to truth."

Eventually, Peithologian became so popular that on July 9, 1821, Columbia's trustees resolved that "for the accommodation of the Philolexian and Peithologian Societies, a suitable building be erected." Peithologian flourished as a society in its own right, dropping its freshman status and opening itself to all undergraduates. Indeed, some students, like John Lloyd Stephens, belonged to both Peithologian and Philolexian. In general, though, the two groups maintained a rivalry that was friendly at best and highly charged at worst. In his famous diary, George Templeton Strong recorded that a Philolexian gathering was disrupted by "those rascally Peithologians"; firecrackers and stink bombs, tossed into the midst of each other's meetings, were usually the weapons of choice.

Although Peithologian's alumni included such prominent names as Columbia president Nicholas Murray Butler (Class of 1882), Nobel laureate Hermann Muller (Class of 1910), and publisher Alfred A. Knopf (Class of 1912), both it and Philolexian suffered declining membership after the turn of the century. The society ceased to exist around World War I, although several undergraduates revived it after World War II.

Former members 
According to The Undergraduate Record published by Columbia College in 1881, former members of the society included:

 John Church Hamilton (1809), son of Alexander Hamilton
 Benjamin T. Onderdonk (1809), Bishop of the Episcopal Diocese of New York from 1830 to 1861
 John Slidell (1810), United States Senator from Louisiana, Confederate States of America minister to France
 William Backhouse Astor Sr. (1811), businessman, member of the Astor family, founder of the Astor Library
 James H. Roosevelt (1819), founder of Roosevelt Hospital
 Robert Goelet Sr. (1828), co-founder of the Chemical Bank of New York
 Robert L. Cutting (1830), co-founder of the Continental Bank of New York and president of the New York Stock Exchange
 John Jay (1836), grandson of Chief Justice John Jay; United States Minister to Austro-Hungary; president of the American Historical Association
 James Renwick Jr. (1836), Gothic Revival architect who designed St. Patrick's Cathedral, New York
 Samuel Blatchford (1837), associate justice of the U.S. Supreme Court
 John Jacob Astor III (1839), financier, philanthropist, member of the Astor family
 William Colford Schermerhorn (1840), lawyer, philanthropist, trustee of Columbia University
 Charles Carow (1844), shipping magnate, father of first lady Edith Roosevelt
 Robert Morrison Olyphant (1842), heir to trading company Olyphant & Co. and president of the Delaware and Hudson Railway
 John Winthrop Chanler (1847), United States Congressman from New York
 Morgan Dix (1848), priest, theologian, rector of Trinity Church
 Horace Carpentier (1848), first mayor of Oakland, California and president of the Overland Telegraph Company
 Cornelius Jeremiah Vanderbilt (1850), son of Cornelius Vanderbilt
 Stewart L. Woodford (1854), Lieutenant Governor of New York and U.S. Minister to Spain
 Robert L. Cutting Jr. (1856), American banker and clubman
 Elbridge Thomas Gerry (1857), lawyer and social reformer who founded the New York Society for the Prevention of Cruelty to Children; grandson of U.S. Vice President Elbridge Gerry
 George Goelet Kip (1865), American lawyer, heir and member of the Goelet family
 William Bayard Cutting (1869), financier, philanthropist, namesake of the Bayard Cutting Arboretum State Park
 Francis S. Bangs (1878), attorney at Bangs, Stetson, Tracy, and McVeigh and trustee of Columbia College
 Edwin Robert Anderson Seligman (1879), American economist
 William Archibald Dunning (1881), founder of the Dunning School of Reconstruction
 Reginald Sayre (1881), orthopedic surgeon and Olympic sport shooter
 Nicholas Murray Butler (1882), president of Columbia University, chairman of the Carnegie Endowment for International Peace and Nobel Peace Prize winner, founder of Horace Mann School and the College Board
 John Kendrick Bangs (1883), author, satirist, editor of Puck magazine
 Francis Lister Hawks Pott (1883), Episcopal missionary and president of St. John's University, Shanghai from 1888 to 1941

See also 
Demosthenian Literary Society
Philolexian Society
Literary society
List of Literary Societies

References

External links 
WikiCU Peithologian Society
Columbia Student Life: The Curriculum and The Extra-Curriculum, 1754 - 2004.

Columbia University student organizations
Student societies in the United States
Student debating societies
College literary societies in the United States